are a mountain range running through Mie Prefecture and along the borders of Gifu and Shiga prefectures in central Japan. In spite of its height, Mount Oike is not the most visited mountain; that distinction belongs to Mount Gozaisho because of its Gozaisho Ropeway, making reaching the peak much easier.

The town of Komono, Mie Prefecture, has many onsen.

The northern part consists of Limestone, and the southern part consists of Granite.

Major peaks

Suzuka Seven Mountains

The following seven mountains are referred to as the "Suzuka Seven Mountains," which greatly increased their popularity and the number of visitors.
Mount Fujiwara (藤原岳), 
Mount Ryū (竜ヶ岳), 
Mount Shaka (釈迦ヶ岳), 
Mount Gozaisho, 
Mount Kama (鎌ヶ岳), 
Mount Amagoi (雨乞岳), 
Mount Nyūdō (入道ヶ岳),

Other peaks
Mount Ryōzen (霊仙山), 
Mount Oike (御池岳), 
Mount Watamuki (綿向山), 
Mount Nihonkoba (日本コバ), 
Hato Peak (羽鳥峰),

See also

Geography of Japan

References

Mountain ranges of Mie Prefecture
Mountain ranges of Gifu Prefecture
Mountain ranges of Shiga Prefecture